Berczy Village  is a  residential neighbourhood in Markham, Ontario, Canada. It is bounded to the north by Major Mackenzie Drive, to the east by McCowan Road, to the south by 16th Avenue, and to the west by Kennedy Road. This area is north of Unionville. The community is named after William Berczy, Markham's founder. The name can be found on limestone plaques throughout the community's many arterial road entrances.

The community is known for its variety of mixed-income dwellings and the green space found in most subdivisions. Townhouses and some semi-detached homes can be found along Bur Oak Avenue, whereas semi-detached and detached homes are found on residential streets. It is also noted for the many garage alleyways behind the townhomes and some semi-detached homes and the plentiful spacious catwalks.

Berczy Village adheres to the city of Markham's development plan for "Smart Growth". The carefully planned urban design scheme puts an emphasis on open space, protection of environmentally sensitive areas, and conservation of woodlots.

History

Berczy Village was established over what was once farmland that belonged to Frederick Bagg, a prominent agriculturalist and Jersey cattle breeder, and his wife Emma. Old historical houses that once belonged to the owners of the land still exist and can be found within the subdivision. It is a highly residential neighbourhood and the construction of the community began in the mid-1990s, with a majority of homes being fully complete in the early 2000s, many built from Madison, Mattamy and Great Gulf homes. Many parts of the Village are still undergoing development and heavy construction, mainly north of Madison Heights Blvd.

The southwestern portion of the community remains undeveloped; it was recently sold to Arista Homes, Fieldgate Homes, Starlane Homes, and Paradise Homes for $100 million. When traveling north or south along Kennedy Road, one will notice a pathway to a house and barn, the Bethesda Lutheran Cemetery, and a few trees stranded in the middle of a massive wheat field. The developers have made preparations for a "tree nursery" to preserve these trees, including the "historic Bur Oak tree".

The Berzcy Village extension known as Upper Unionville was completed in 2017 and it was themed to resemble Unionville Main Street. The property was farmed by the Beckett family since 1917 until development began in 2011. Streets are named after the family and historic preservation of the farm home and historic Berzcy cabin has been incorporated into the Upper Unionville plan.

Demographic Information
The demographics of Berczy Village is diverse with residents coming from predominantly East Asian (mostly Chinese Canadian) heritage. Residents of Berczy Village also include South Asian, Middle Eastern, European, African, and mixed heritage Canadian families.

† Footnote: Based on the 2006 Census.

Parks

The community has many large open green spaces and forest groves.

The main parks in Berczy Village are:
Berczy Park

Bur Oak Avenue divides this massive park in the village center. The north part has three soccer fields with bleachers, a playground, a circular pathway, a pond with a bridge, and a parking lot. The southern portion has an oval pathway with a baseball diamond and a little stream with a bridge over it.
Frederick Bagg Park

Named in honour of the area's former land owner, this park east of All Saints Catholic Elementary School has a plaque honoring Bagg and his family and a circular pathway encircling a small playground and shelter.
Nördlingen Park

Found in the southern portion of the village, close to 16th Avenue. It is dedicated in honour of Markham's twin city of Nördlingen in Bavaria, Germany. It contains a small pond with a playground area.
Williamstown Green

An open space of grass and tall trees west of the Williamstown Plaza along Bur Oak Avenue.

 Berczy Square

A new park with a pond and a bronze statue of William Berczy will be built at the corner of Kennedy Road and 16th Avenue.

Politics
Berczy Village is part of the following political districts:
Ward 6, Amanda Yeung Collucci
Markham-Unionville, provincial electoral riding, represented by MPP Billy Pang (Conservative)
Markham-Unionville, federal electoral riding, represented by MP Paul Chiang(Liberal)

William Berczy Settlement Historical Cemetery

Along Kennedy Road is the William Berczy Settlement Historical Cemetery, formerly Bethesda Church and Burying Ground. The site was once the home of Phillip Eckardt, then home to St. Phiilip's Lutheran Church from 1820 to 1910.

Religious institutions

Churches
Unionville Alliance Church
Unionville Oasis

Schools
All Saints Catholic Elementary School
Castlemore Public School
Pierre Elliott Trudeau High School
Stonebridge Public School
Beckett Farm Public School

Bur Oak High School

Transportation
The main arterial roads that pass through Berczy Village are Bur Oak Avenue, Castlemore Avenue, and The Bridle Walk. Other important arterial streets include Ridgecrest Road, Stonebridge Drive, and William Berczy Boulevard.

Public Transit
The following bus routes have services in and around this community:
TTC Route 129A - McCowan North
YRT Route 4A - Major MacKenzie
YRT Route 8 - Kennedy
YRT Route 18 - Bur Oak
YRT Route 16 - 16th Avenue
YRT Route 42/204 - Berczy South Unionville

References

Neighbourhoods in Markham, Ontario